Lyclene classeigera is a moth of the family Erebidae. It was described by Jeremy Daniel Holloway in 2001. It is found on Sumatra and Borneo. The habitat consists of lowland forests.

The length of the forewings is about 8 mm.

References

Nudariina
Moths described in 2001
Moths of Asia